The Morris Murders are the unsolved murders in 1879 of husband and wife Charles Henry Morris (born May 9, 1847) and Esther Jones Morris (born September 22, 1850) of Decatur, Michigan.

The murders
On the night of September 28, 1879, in a farmhouse along an isolated country road in Decatur, Michigan, Mr. and Mrs. Morris retired to bed at about 8:30. The only other individual in the house at the time was a woman who worked for them by the name of Jennie Bull. At around 9p.m. Mr. and Mrs. Morris were inexplicably shot dead within minutes of one another and were left where they fell. Nothing was taken save for a horse, used for the purposes of escape by the assailant.

Shortly after sunrise, Jennie Bull informed a farmhand employed by the Morrises (upon his arrival) that she had found both Mr. and Mrs. Morris shot to death. Charles Morris was found lying on the front porch and Esther Morris was found lying in the bedroom. A lot of stories circulated in the months afterward. The most prominent ones were about Jennie Bull (housekeeper) and Riley Huntley (handyman). The murder was shocking to the small frontier community and was immediately prioritized by the local police (as well as every other person in the area). Shortly thereafter, the Pinkerton Detective Agency was brought in, but did not solve the crime.

The story that made its way around was that on the night of September 28, Morris must have gotten out of bed because someone was at his back porch. That is where he was shot dead. Then Mrs. Morris, who must have seen the murderer entering the house (after hearing the gunshot), curiously dropped the revolver she was carrying and ran to hide in the bedroom closet. That is where she was shot dead. No money was taken. No jewels were taken regardless of the fact that the Morrises' jewels and money were found in the house and "easily visible." The killer then rode away, into the night, stealing one of Morrises' best horses and was seen by neighbor Charles Rosewarne. The murderer galloped right past him, between 9:30 and 10:00pm, and Rosewarne told everyone about the strange rider and in particular that "He wore a funny hat." That same horse was found in South Bend, Indiana, a few days later. The horse was worn-out, exhausted, and with a "strange fresh branding on it left rear flank." It was later revealed that Mrs. Morris was pregnant at the time of her murder.

Floyd Smith
A local man by the name of Floyd Smith was accused. He was accused by Riley Huntley who was a handyman previously discharged by the Morrises reportedly due to his "drinking." After the authorities became suspicious of Huntley, Huntley accused Floyd Smith and swore out a complaint. On the night of December 17, 1879, Floyd Smith was taken into custody. He was arrested by Constable Botsford and assisted by another deputy named of Scott Smith (no relation to Floyd). However, before he could be placed in jail, the police were ambushed and Floyd was taken. He was not freed as some initially thought, he was instead taken into the woods near Decatur, strung up, tortured for hours, and told to confess. He did not confess. Floyd Smith's life was ruined and he moved away. Floyd was never the same, he had serious injuries to his neck and his wife died shortly afterward from the trauma of the incident. In those years after, Floyd only ever said he knew nothing of the Morris murder. On his death-bed he stated the same. The horrific and sensational murder was covered heavily by the newspapers across the state of Michigan and gained national attention. And though it was investigated vigorously the murderer was never caught.

See also 
 List of homicides in Michigan

Further reading
 

 

 
Kohler, William G. (2021) A Trail of Money and Death: Matteson and the Morris Murders. Amazon. pp. 287 pages ISBN  978-1737381600

References

External links
 The Morris Murders, Newspaper Articles 
 The Morris Murders, Newspaper Articles 
 "The Morris Murder House", Lyla Fox Writing 
 "Solving the Cold Case", Roy M. Davis 
 "The Historic Morris Murder", John Mason 

People murdered in Michigan
1879 in Michigan
Unsolved murders in the United States
1879 murders in the United States
Van Buren County, Michigan